Leunis is a Flemish-origin surname. Notable people with the surname include:

 Joanna Leunis (born 1981), Belgian dancer
 Johannes Matthias Joseph Leunis (1802–1873), German clergyman naturalist

Surnames of Belgian origin